Michael Rodrigues (born August 31, 1982) is a retired elite acrobatic gymnast who now performs in the Cirque du Soleil show Viva ELVIS in Las Vegas, Nevada, along with his former mixed-pairs partner, retired elite acrobatic gymnast Kristin Allen.

Allen and Rodrigues won the gold medal in the mixed-pair all-around at the 2010 Acrobatic Gymnastics World Championships in Wrocław, Poland. They also won the all-around title at 2010 U.S. National Acrobatic Gymnastics Championships in Kissimmee, Florida, placing first in the all-around, dynamic and balance.

They became the first U.S. athletes to win the mixed-pairs gold medal at the 2009 World Games in Kaohsiung, Taiwan, which are considered the equivalent of the Olympic Games for acrobatic gymnastics. At the 2009 Acro Cup in Albershausen, Germany, the pair placed first in dynamic and second in the all-around and in balance.

The previous year, Rodrigues and Allen won the mixed-pair all-around silver medal at the World Championships in Glasgow, Scotland. At the 2008 National Championships and Junior Olympics Nationals in Des Moines, Iowa, the pair won the all-around, dynamic and balance.)

Allen and Rodrigues trained together at West Coast Training Center in Livermore, California, with coach Marie Annonson. The pair became partners in August 2007.

Rodrigues was a member of the U.S. Senior National Team from 200 to 2011, and Allen was a member of the U.S. Senior National Team from 2006 to 2011.

Prior to competing with Allen, Rodrigues was the base of an elite mixed pair with now-retired acrobatic gymnast Clare Brunson, and they trained together at Empire AcroGymnastics in Riverside, California and Mission Hills Gymnastics, also in Riverside. The pair were trained by Russian coach Youri Vorobyev, who is now owner and head acrobatics coach of Realis Gymnastics Academy in Moreno Valley, California.

In 2006, Michael Rodrigues and Clare Brunson won the mixed-pair all-around bronze medal at the 2006 World Championships in Coimbra, Portugal, and were designated World Class Gymnasts by the Federation of International Gymnastics (FIG). They also won the all-around silver medal at the 2006 World Cup in Puurs, Belgium.

In 2005, Rodrigues and Brunson placed fourth all-around at the 2005 World Games in Duisburg, Germany.

References

External links
 Rodrigues and Allen Balance Routine
 Cirque du Soleil Feature
 
 

1982 births
Living people
American gymnasts
American acrobatic gymnasts
People from Livermore, California
World Games gold medalists
Male acrobatic gymnasts
Competitors at the 2009 World Games
Medalists at the Acrobatic Gymnastics World Championships